The Priority Development Assistance Fund (PDAF) was a discretionary fund in the Philippines available to members of Congress. Originally established as the Countrywide Development Fund (CDF) in 1990, it was designed to allow legislators to fund small-scale infrastructure or community projects which fell outside the scope of the national infrastructure program, which was often restricted to large infrastructure items.

The PDAF was commonly called the "pork barrel", and was the subject of much public criticism following exposés on abuses perpetuated by members of Congress on use of the fund in 1996 and 2013. 

On November 19, 2013, the Supreme Court declared the PDAF unconstitutional, thereby abolishing it.

See also
 People's Initiative Against Pork Barrel
 Priority Development Assistance Fund scam
 Padrino System
 Disbursement Acceleration Program

References

External links
PDAF portal at the website of the Department of Budget and Management

Politics of the Philippines
1990 establishments in the Philippines

2013 disestablishments in the Philippines
Funds